"Adventure of a Lifetime" is a song by British rock band Coldplay. It was released on 6 November 2015 as the lead single from their seventh studio album, A Head Full of Dreams (2015). The track reached number seven on the UK Singles Chart and number 13 on the Billboard Hot 100. It also reached the top 20 in a number of countries, including Australia, Austria, Canada, Czech Republic, France, Germany, Ireland, Italy, the Netherlands, New Zealand, and Switzerland.

Reception
"Adventure of a Lifetime" received generally favourable reviews from music critics. Writing for Idolator, Bianca Gracie and Robbie Daw rated the song 7/10 and 8/10 respectively, stating that the song is "incredibly vibrant in an almost childlike, blissful way that gives such an energetic rush" and that it is "the best Coldplay single in seven years". Mondo Sonoro (#50), Muzikalia (N/A), NME (#19), and Rolling Stone (#41) ranked "Adventure of a Lifetime" as one of the best songs of 2015 in their year-end lists.

Music video
The official music video was directed by the band's long-time collaborator, Mat Whitecross. It was released on 29 November 2015. The concept for the video was hatched after Coldplay frontman Chris Martin and British motion capture expert/actor Andy Serkis met on a plane and discussed ideas. It took about six months to make the music video, which as of May, 2022 has received over 1.3 billion views on YouTube.

Synopsis
The CGI animated video features a group of chimpanzees that come across a Beats Pill speaker under a pile of leaves. The primates then discover the power of music and form a band that resembles the band members.

The video begins with a similar layout with Coldplay's 2011 music video, "Paradise". As it opens, four chimpanzees (played by the band members) are sitting in a forest. The opening verses begin after a chimpanzee (played by Jonny Buckland) finds a portable speaker under a pile of leaves. Another chimpanzee (played by Chris Martin) listens to the music and calls the rest of the group (played by Guy Berryman and Will Champion) to gather. It then slaps its chest and jumps to a path inside the forest alone.

The character sings the song and swings on the willow tree vines. Then, the four chimpanzees dance together during the chorus. After the chorus, they find an electric guitar, a bass and a drum set. The chimpanzees bang on the instruments before they realize their proper use. The characters play the instruments and form an "ape band". Buckland's character gains a hat and Berryman's gains an earring.

During the bridge of the song, the band is surrounded by other chimpanzees (also played by the band). The rest of the video features the dance movements of the other chimpanzees and the performance of the ape band. At the end of the video, Martin's character climbs up to a tree and overlooks the view of the forest which also features some Indian temples, a reference to the Indian inspiration of the associated album, A Head Full of Dreams.

Background and production
According to The Guardian, the video was shot at The Imaginarium, where the reboot series of Planet of the Apes and parts of Avengers: Age of Ultron and Star Wars: The Force Awakens were filmed. English choreographer Holly Blakey was responsible for creating the band's dance moves.

Hannah Clark, the producer of the video commented, "As creatures go, chimps are one of the more difficult to animate. Not only are they quite human in their movement, but they are covered in hair. Add to this that we had no backgrounds shot, and we were asking an awful lot of any post-collaborator."
The band's faces were covered in a special, reflective and light-catching make-up that allowed the computers to appropriately interpret the video feed and create renders of the chimpanzees' characters.
The band members weren't playing real instruments, but similarly shaped objects that enabled creation of realistic body positions.

The animation, visual effects and motion design of the video was carried out by Mathematic – a Paris-based production company. Mat Whitecross filmed the band using a special camera.
Each of band members also wore a head-mounted camera system that was configured into a three camera solution. The camera systems provided multiple video streams from which the production team was able to recreate 3D points.

Release
A 15-second teaser named "#AOALvideo November 27" was uploaded on the band's official YouTube account on 12 November 2015. The teaser consisted a short excerpt of the video, behind-the-scenes video and animated video of the single artwork. The geometric pattern and the representative pattern of the album, Flower of Life appeared at the end of the teaser. The music video was uploaded on the official page of the band at 8:00 a.m. (UK time) on 27 November 2015. On 29 November 2015, the video was uploaded on the official YouTube account.

In other media
 On 29 December 2015, the song was made available as downloadable content for the music video game Rock Band 4.
 In 2016, Coldplay performed the song at Super Bowl 50's halftime show with Bruno Mars and Beyoncé.
 It is used as the theme to The Steffan Tubbs show heard in Denver, Colorado on News/Talk station 710KNUS.

Track listing

Personnel
Credits are adapted from A Head Full of Dreams liner notes.
Coldplay
Guy Berryman – bass guitar, keyboards
Jonny Buckland – lead guitar, keyboards
Will Champion – drums, programming, vocals
Chris Martin – lead vocals, piano, acoustic guitar

Additional musicians
Merry Clayton – backing vocals
Mikkel S Eriksen – additional instruments, production, mixing
Tor Erik Hermansen – additional instruments, production, mixing
Phil Tan – audio mixer

Charts

Weekly charts

Year-end charts

Certifications

Release history

See also
 List of number-one songs of 2016 (Mexico)
 List of number-one dance singles of 2016 (U.S.)

References

External links

2015 singles
2015 songs
Coldplay songs
Disco songs
Funk songs
Number-one singles in Israel
Parlophone singles
Song recordings produced by Rik Simpson
Song recordings produced by Stargate (record producers)
Songs written by Chris Martin
Songs written by Guy Berryman
Songs written by Jonny Buckland
Songs written by Will Champion
Animated music videos
Songs about primates
Music videos directed by Mat Whitecross